Nathan Enrique Steinwascher (born February 15, 1993) is an American soccer player who plays as a goalkeeper for Detroit City FC in the USL Championship.

Professional career

Detroit City FC 
Steinwascher made his USL Championship debut against San Antonio FC on March 12, 2022. Steinwascher would go on to claim the USL Championship Save of the Month Award for March 2022 on April 11, 2022, for saving a penalty taken by PC in Steinwascher's debut.

References

External links 
 M2 profile

1993 births
Living people
American expatriate soccer players
American soccer players
Association football goalkeepers
Detroit City FC players
Detroit Mercy Titans men's soccer players
Expatriate footballers in Sweden
National Independent Soccer Association players
National Premier Soccer League players
People from Sterling Heights, Michigan
Soccer players from Michigan
USL Championship players
American expatriate sportspeople in Sweden
Indoor soccer goalkeepers